Henry Schenck Tanner (1786–1858), was an American cartographer, born in New York City.

He produced A Geographical and Statistical Account of the Epidemic Cholera from its Commencement in India to its Entrance into the United States in 1832 in response to the worldwide cholera epidemic of 1817.

Tanner wished to provide a geographic account of the spread of the disease, stating that other statistics concerning the epidemic were "given in such a loose and unconnected manner as to render a reference to them at once irksome and unprofitable." His publication included global, national and local maps, data tables showing number of deaths in different localities by country, and detailed maps of the United States and New York City with small red dots indicating points where the disease had broken out.

Tanner produced a map of Mexico in 1822, which became the basis for the map by John Disturnell in 1847, used in the boundary negotiations of the U.S. and Mexico following the Mexican–American War. Tanner's map contained some errors, reproduced by Disturnell.

In 1846, Tanner published A New Universal Atlas.

See also 
 Geographer John Melish, a contemporary of Henry Schenck Tanner
 Geologic map of Georgia

References

External links 

 Tanner's 1822 map , from The Oregon Encyclopedia

1786 births
1858 deaths
American cartographers
Scientists from New York City